The National Reconstruction Party of Romania (PRN) was a political party in Romania.

History
The PRN contested the 1990 general elections, receiving around 0.4% of the vote for the Senate and 0.3% of the vote for the Chamber of Deputies. Although it failed to win a seat in the Senate, the party won a single seat in the Chamber.

Electoral history

Legislative elections

References

Defunct political parties in Romania